Girls Behind Bars is a 1949 West German drama film directed by Alfred Braun and starring Petra Peters, Richard Häussler and Edelweiß Malchin.

It was made at the Tempelhof Studios in Berlin.
The film's sets were designed by the art director Willi Herrmann.

Cast
 Petra Peters as Ursula Schumann
 Richard Häussler as Breuhaus
 Edelweiß Malchin as Elfie Meyen
 Susi Deitz as Wanda Schmidt
 Gina Presgott as Irmchen Fischer, 'Würmchen'
 Marianne Prenzel as Lore Liebhold
 Micheline Hoerle as Isolde Loring, 'Isa'
 Gabriele Heßmann as Irmgard Rechenberg, 'Boss'
 Ruth Hausmeister as Ilse Heidenreich, 'Heidin'
 Berta Drews as Paula Rellspieß, 'Spiess'
 Else Ehser as Hanna Späthe, 'Hannchen'
 Elisabeth Wendt as Else Richnow, 'Bohnenstange'
 Ralph Lothar as Richard Halbes
 Fritz Wagner  as Harald Hauffe
 Arno Paulsen as Helmcke
 Erich Dunskus as Franz Schmidt
 Alice Treff as Frau Schumann
 Renée Stobrawa as Frau Liebhold
 Hildegard Grethe as Frau Hardtcke
 Wolfgang Kühne as Dr. Helwig
 Carl Heinz Charrell as Paulus

References

Bibliography
 Bergfelder, Tim. International Adventures: German Popular Cinema and European Co-Productions in the 1960s. Berghahn Books, 2005.

External links 
 

1949 films
1949 drama films
German drama films
West German films
1940s German-language films
Films directed by Alfred Braun
Films shot at Tempelhof Studios
Women in prison films
German black-and-white films
1940s German films